Hickory Corner may refer to:

Hickory Corner, Indiana
Hickory Corner, New Jersey